The Hay Bridge is a bridge across the Griboedov Canal in Saint Petersburg, Russia.

History 
The bridge gets its name from the nearby Sennaya Square.

It was first built in 1931 as a single-span pedestrian bridge carrying heating pipes. In 1952, the main span was in need of emergency repair, and the bridge was fully rebuilt by the project of engineer P.B. Bazhenov as an elegant steel structure with cast iron railings.

Gallery

References 

Bridges in Saint Petersburg
Bridges completed in 1931
Bridges completed in 1952